The Autolook Week is an annual motorsport festival was held for the first time in Turin from 7 to 11 September 2022.

The motorsport festival was presented by Andrea Levy, organizer of this event, of the Turin Auto Show held from 2015 to 2019 at Parco del Valentino and of Milano Monza Open-Air Motor Show (MIMO), together with Stefano Lo Russo, Mayor of Turin, and Alberto Cirio, president of the Piedmont Region.

The event took place in the streets of the center of Turin on the occasion of the Centenary of the Autodromo Nazionale di Monza and the 2022 Italian Grand Prix.

2022 
The following vehicles were showcased at the festival in 2022:
 Ferrari 488 Challenge Evo
 Ferrari 296 GTB
 Formula One Ferrari F399 Michael Schumacher (1999)
 Lancia Beta Montecarlo (1980)
 Lancia Stratos (1975)
 Fiat Abarth 124 Rally (1973)
 Toyota Celica GT4 ST165 Carlos Sainz Sr. (1990)
 Lancia LC2
 IndyCar Reynard Honda Alex Zanardi (1996)

References

Auto shows in Italy
2022 establishments in Italy
Turin